This is intended to be a complete list of articles detailing clubs, societies and other common leisure activities associated with the University of Cambridge, England.

Sports

General 
 Varsity match, the annual match for each sports team against the University of Oxford
 Cambridge Blue, an award for competing at the highest level of University sport
 The Hawks' Club, a social club for men with a Blue, Half Blue or Second Team Colours

Clubs 
 Association football:
 Cambridge University Association Football League
 CUAFL Cuppers
 CUAFL Plate
 CUAFL Shield
 CUAFL Vase
 Cambridge University Association Football Club
 Pegasus A.F.C., a now-defunct combined Oxford-Cambridge football team
 Cambridge University Cricket Club
 Rugby union:
 Cambridge University Rugby Union Football Club
 The Varsity Match, the annual rugby union varsity match
Cambridge University Automobile Club
 Cambridge University Lawn Tennis Club
Strange Blue, the Cambridge University Ultimate Club

Rowing 
 Cambridge University Boat Club
 Cambridge University Combined Boat Clubs
 Cambridge University Lightweight Rowing Club
 Cambridge University Women's Boat Club
 The Boat Race
 Women's Boat Race
 Henley Boat Races

College boat clubs 
 Caius Boat Club
 Christ's College Boat Club
 Churchill College Boat Club
 Clare Boat Club
 Corpus Christi College Boat Club
 Downing College Boat Club
 Emmanuel Boat Club
 Fitzwilliam College Boat Club
 Girton College Boat Club
 Homerton College Boat Club
 Hughes Hall Boat Club
 Jesus College Boat Club
 King's College Boat Club
 Lady Margaret Boat Club (St John's College)
 Lucy Cavendish College Boat Club
 Magdalene Boat Club
 Murray Edwards College Boat Club (previously New Hall Boat Club)
 Newnham College Boat Club
 Pembroke College Boat Club
 Peterhouse Boat Club
 Queens' College Boat Club
 Robinson College Boat Club
 Selwyn College Boat Club
 Sidney Sussex College Boat Club
 St. Catharine's College Boat Club
 Trinity College:
 First Trinity Boat Club
 Second Trinity Boat Club
 Third Trinity Boat Club
 First and Third Trinity Boat Club
 Trinity Hall Boat Club

Bumps races 
 Lent Bumps
 May Bumps

Political societies 
Cambridge University Liberal Association
 Cambridge Union Society, commonly known as the Cambridge Union - a debating union
 Cambridge University Conservative Association
 Cambridge University Labour Club
 The Wilberforce Society, the student think-tank

Academic societies 
 The Archimedeans 
 Trinity Mathematical Society
 Cambridge University Scientific Society
 Cambridge University Moral Sciences Club
 Cambridge Philosophical Society
 Cambridge University Law Society
 Cambridge University SPS Society

Drama societies 
 Amateur Dramatic Club
 Cambridge University Gilbert and Sullivan Society
 Footlights, an amateur dramatics and comedy club
 Cambridge University Light Entertainment Society
 Improvised Comedy Ents (ICE), the University's oldest improv society
 Alcock Improv, another improv society
 The Corpus Christi Fletcher Players
 The Movement, now a professional theatre company but still using actors from the University.
 Christ's Amateur Dramatic Society
 Girton Amateur Dramatics Society (GADS)

Student Unions 
 Cambridge University Students' Union, the Cambridge-wide federal union
 Graduate Union, the students' union specifically for Graduates

Musical societies 
 Cambridge University Musical Society (CUMS), a federation of the university's main orchestral and choral ensembles, which cumulatively put on a substantial concert season during the university term.
 Cambridge University Jazz Society
 Cambridge University Hip Hop Society
 Cambridge University Ceilidh Band (CUCB)
 Cambridge University Brass Band (CUBB)
 Cambridge University Opera Society (CUOS)
 Cambridge University Jazz Orchestra (CUJO)
 Cambridge Gamelan Society
 Cambridge University Steel Pan Society

College Music societies 
 Emmanuel College Music Society (ECMS)
 Selwyn College Music Society (SCMS)
 Homerton College Music Society (HCMS)
 Trinity College Music Society (TCMS)
 Clare College Music Society (CCMS)
 Fitzwilliam College Music Society (FCMS)
 St John's College Music Society (SJCMS)
 MagSoc

Choirs 
 Choir of King's College, Cambridge, a world-renowned choir known for broadcast services, specifically Carols from King's.
 Choir of Trinity College, Cambridge, a renowned choral society.
 Choir of Sidney Sussex College, Cambridge, directed by David Skinner, (musicologist) and, uniquely among the collegiate choirs of Oxford and Cambridge, it sings an entirely Latin Vespers weekly.
 Choir of Clare College, Cambridge, directed by Graham Ross, (musician) and funded by John Rutter.
 Choir of Gonville and Caius College, Cambridge
 Christ's College Chapel Choir, Cambridge
 King's Voices, a mixed voice chapel choir based in King's College, Cambridge
 Choir of St John's College, Cambridge, a renowned choir that recently, 2022, allowed women and girls to participate.
 Queens' College Chapel Choir, Cambridge

Miscellaneous societies 

 Cam FM, the student radio station
 Cambridge Apostles, an elite intellectual secret society
 Cambridge Explorers, secret social and adventuring club
 Cambridge Inter-Collegiate Christian Union, a student Christian organisation
 Granta, periodical which started as a student society
 Hawks' Club, a member's club for university sportsmen
 Cambridge University Heraldic and Genealogical Society, a society dedicated to the study of heraldry and genealogy
 University Pitt Club, an exclusive social club
 Cambridge University Punting Society, the oldest and largest extant punting society in the world.
 Cambridge University Science Fiction Society (CUSFS), known as one of the likely creators of The Game
 Jómsborg the New - the Fantasy Fiction Society, and subset of CUSFS
 The Cambridge Student, a student newspaper
 Cambridge Student Community Action, a charity and volunteering organisation
 Cambridge University Tiddlywinks Club, the world's oldest tiddlywinks club
 Varsity, a student newspaper
 Cambridge University Wine society, the university wine society
 Cambridge University Wireless Society, the university amateur radio club

College clubs and societies 
 Gonville & Caius A.F.C., the only college team to have reached the 1st round of the FA Cup
 Pembroke Players, an amateur dramatics society
 Go and Yes Minister Society (found in Girton College)
 Pembroke College Winnie-the-Pooh Society
 Churchill Regular Association for Poker

Leisure activities 
 Formal Hall, a formal dinner in a college
 June Event, an alternative to May Balls
 May Balls, a college ball, usually held annually in May Week
 May Week, the week after the end of examinations, actually in June
 Punting
 Suicide Sunday, the Sunday during May Week

References

External links 
 University Of Cambridge Registered Clubs & Societies
 Societies hosted on the SRCF

Social activities
Social activities
Social activities